Richard Maurice Conroy (26 April 1919 - December 2006) is an English retired professional footballer who played as a full back in the Football League.

References

1919 births
2006 deaths
English footballers
Fulham F.C. players
Accrington Stanley F.C. (1891) players
Scunthorpe United F.C. players
English Football League players
Footballers from Bradford
Association football fullbacks